Portrait of a Young Man or Portrait of a Youth, a portrait attributed to Sandro Botticelli (1446–1510), is an example of Italian Renaissance painting. It was painted in the early or late (c. 1489-1490) 1480s  with tempera on panel and is now housed in the National Gallery of Art in Washington, D.C. The painting was attributed to Botticelli by art historian Bernard Berenson in 1922. Features of this piece include his interesting expression and elegant hand gesture, which some have interpreted as an early depiction of juvenile arthritis or Marfan syndrome.

References

1480s paintings

Collections of the National Gallery of Art
Portraits by Sandro Botticelli
15th-century portraits